is a passenger railway station located in the city of Fuchū, Tokyo, Japan, operated by the private railway operator Seibu Railway.

Lines

Station layout
The station has one side platform serving a single bidirectional track.

Platforms

History

Station numbering was introduced on all Seibu Railway lines during fiscal 2012, with Kyōteijō-mae Station becoming "SW05".

Passenger statistics
In fiscal 2019, the station was the 82nd busiest on the Seibu network with an average of 2,924 passengers daily. 

The passenger figures for previous years are as shown below.

Surrounding area
Tamagawa Boat Race Stadium

References

External links

 Kyōteijō-mae Station information (Seibu Railway) 

Railway stations in Japan opened in 1919
Railway stations in Tokyo
Seibu Tamagawa Line
Fuchū, Tokyo